Muhammad Gado Nasko (born 1941) was the military governor of Sokoto State, Nigeria between 1978 and 1979.

Early life 
Nasko retired from the army in 1993 after Abacha took over from Sonekan. He was at the time a Lt. General  and retired to his village Home in Nasko Niger state quietly to his new life as a farmer and community leader. he was decorated by president Olusegun Obasanjo with the national honour award of Commander of the Order of the Niger (CON) and recognised as one of the most respected states men in Nigeria. Former Gado Nasko Barracks, now Lungi Barracks, in the nation's capital Abuja, was named for him. He is married to two wives Fatima and Rakiya with 9 children namely: Umar, Hamza, Ibrahim, Abdulazeez, Abubakar, Aminu, Fatima, Zainab, and Maryam.

Timeline 
Nigeria Military Training School: 1962-1963
School of Artillery, Larkill:  1963-1964
Commissioned Officer, Corps of Artillery: July 1964
Commandant of the School of Artillery: 1969-1975
Commander 2nd Artillery Brigade: 1975-1976
Military Secretary]: 1976-1978
Military Governor Sokoto State: 1978-1979
Commandant 1st Divisional Artillery: 1979-1980
Commandant Corps of Artillery: 1980-1985
Minister of Trade, Agriculture and Water resources: 1985-1989
Minister for the federal Capital Territory, Abuja: 1989-1993

Notes

References 
   Nasko Barracks
 Sokoto State Government

1941 births
Living people
Nigerian military governors of Sokoto State
Ministers of the Federal Capital Territory (Nigeria)
Federal ministers of Nigeria
People from Niger State
Commanders of the Order of the Niger